Hobart Lake National Wildlife Refuge is a  Easement Refuge located in Barnes County, North Dakota five miles (8 km) west of Valley City. The refuge 

The refuge was established by Executive Orders during the Franklin D. Roosevelt administration and was set aside as "a refuge and breeding grounds for migratory birds and other wildlife." The refuge is maintained by the Valley City Wetland Management District and is a part of the Arrowwood National Wildlife Refuge Complex.

The refuge is a migration stopover for waterfowl. In addition, tundra swans frequently use the refuge during spring and fall migrations. Much of the refuge lands are cultivated by the owner; however, some waterfowl nesting and brood rearing takes place on portions of the refuge. There are some limited opportunities for wildlife observation and photography from public roads around the refuge.

See also
 List of National Wildlife Refuges

External links
  - includes Hobart Lake National Wildlife Refuge

National Wildlife Refuges in North Dakota
Easement refuges in North Dakota
Protected areas of Barnes County, North Dakota